Life with Roger is an American sitcom television series created by Howard Adler and Robert Griffard, that aired on The WB from September 8, 1996 to March 30, 1997, as part of its 1996–97 schedule.

Synopsis
Life with Roger starred Mike O'Malley as Roger Hoyt, a formerly suicidal homeless young man dissuaded from jumping off of a bridge by Jason Fuller (Maurice Godin), a man whose car had coincidentally broken down on the bridge just before Roger could complete his planned jump. Jason, a medical doctor, talks Roger out of going through with his suicide plan, and Roger repairs his car. They eventually become roommates when Roger talks Jason out of marrying his fiancėe, and typical sitcom mayhem ensues. Hallie Todd co-starred as Jason's sister, Lanie Clark, and Meredith Scott Lynn played Myra, Jason's former fiancėe.

The series premiered on September 8, 1996, airing twenty episodes, before being canceled in March 1997 due to low ratings.

Cast
 Mike O'Malley as Roger Hoyt
 Maurice Godin as Jason Fuller
 Hallie Todd as Lanie Clark
 Meredith Scott Lynn as Myra
 Heather Paige Kent as Kate

Episodes

References

External links
  
 

1990s American sitcoms
1996 American television series debuts
1997 American television series endings
English-language television shows
Television series by Warner Bros. Television Studios
The WB original programming
Television shows set in New York City
Latino sitcoms